K. Bocholter V.V. is a Belgian football club based in the municipality of Bocholt, registered with the Belgian FA under matricule 595. The full name of the club is Koninklijke Bocholter Voetbalvereniging (Royal Bocholt Football Association) and it has white and black as club colours. The club has played most of its time in the Belgian Provincial Leagues, but managed to climb up to the national level towards the end of the 20th century.

History
Bocholter VV was founded in 1922 by former footballer Johannes Robersscheuten, most known for playing for clubs such as PSV Eindhoven, Antwerp and Capellen. Together with some friends he formed the first squad. In 1924 the club formally joined the Belgian FA and in 1925 it started its first official season at the fourth provincial level, at that time the seventh level in the Belgian football league system.

The club immediately took three consecutive titles, quickly rising to the highest provincial level, before promoting into the lowest national level in 1931, at that time known as Promotion and at the third overal level. The club would remain only one season at this level, returning immediately into the provincial leagues where it would continue playing for several decades. A first revival occurred in the 1960s, as Bocholt again promoted into the national level. This lowest level was still called promotion but was now situated at the fourth level. This time the club was able to hold on for a second season, before again relegating into the provincial levels.

Several more decades at the lower levels passed before the club started a strong period towards the end of the 20th century. In 1998 the club took the title at the first provincial level, promoting into the Belgian Fourth Division, returning to the national level after more than 30 years. The club now managed to obtain decent results and avoid relegation, even obtaining the title after three seasons, promoting to the Belgian Third Division in 2001. Since then, the club has quite comfortably managed to stay at this level, several times even qualifying for the promotion play-offs, but without success. In 2016, a reform of Belgian football inserted a higher level, causing Bocholt now to play at the fourth level again, in the Belgian Division 2 (initially called Belgian Second Amateur Division , until 2020).

References 

Association football clubs established in 1922
Football clubs in Belgium
1922 establishments in Belgium